The men's 500 metres races of the 2013–14 ISU Speed Skating World Cup 6, arranged in the Thialf arena, in Heerenveen, Netherlands, was held on 15 and 16 March 2014.

Ronald Mulder of the Netherlands won the race on Saturday, while Jan Smeekens of the Netherlands came second, and Gilmore Junio of Canada came third.

The Sunday race saw an all-Dutch podium, as Mulder and Smeekens switched places in the top, and Mulder's brother Michel Mulder came third.

Race 1
Race one took place on Saturday, 15 March, scheduled at 16:41.

Division A

Race 2
Race two took place on Sunday, 16 March, scheduled at 16:49.

Division A

References

Men 0500
6